These are the official results of the Women's High Jump event at the 1990 European Championships in Split, Yugoslavia, held at Stadion Poljud on 30 and 31 August 1990. There were a total number of eighteen participating athletes.

Medalists

Results

Qualification

Final

Participation
According to an unofficial count, 18 athletes from 13 countries participated in the event.

 (1)
 (1)
 (1)
 (1)
 (1)
 (1)
 (2)
 (1)
 (1)
 (1)
 (3)
 (3)
 (1)

See also
 National champions high jump (women)
 1988 Women's Olympic High Jump (Seoul)
 1991 Women's World Championships High Jump (Tokyo)
 1992 Women's Olympic High Jump (Barcelona)
 1994 Women's European Championships High Jump (Helsinki)

References

 Results

High jump
High jump at the European Athletics Championships
1990 in women's athletics